ANSS may refer to:
 Assam Nepali Sahitya Sabha
 Advanced National Seismic System
 The NASDAQ stock-ticker of Ansys